Juhani Henrik Lagerspetz (born in Turku, 1959) is a Finnish pianist trained at the Turku Conservatory and the Sibelius Academy, where he serves as a lecturer. He was prized by the Alfred Kordelin Foundation in 1994.

Lagerspetz may be best known for his recordings for Ondine, including Mikko Heiniö and Jukka Tiensuu's, respectively, Hermes and Mind Piano Concertos. He has also recorded Maurice Ravel's solo piano works for YLE and served as an accompanist to Truls Mørk at a recording of Johannes Brahms's Cello Sonatas for Simax Classics.

References
  Kuhmo Chamber Music Festival
  Classics Online

Finnish classical pianists
1959 births
Living people
21st-century classical pianists